Kirill Tsepenkov (born 8 July 2004) is a Belarusian professional footballer who plays for Dinamo Brest.

References

External links 
 
 

2004 births
Living people
People from Shklow
Sportspeople from Mogilev Region
Belarusian footballers
Association football forwards
FC Rukh Brest players
FC Dynamo Brest players